The Cherry Pick or  De Kersenpluk  is a 1997 Dutch film directed by Arno Kranenborg.

Cast
Annelieke Bouwers		
Lukas Dijkema	... 	Jan Tabak
Hainie Hemme	... 	Buschauffeur
Meiko Kijf	... 	Kapper
Ricky Koole	... 	Marie
Dirk Kuik	... 	Taxichauffeur
Fina Kuik	... 	Vrouw in schiettent
Grietje Kuik	... 	Vrouw van zweefmolen
Tini Osinga	... 	Oma
Hennie Scheper	... 	Tweeling
Willem Scheper	... 	Tweeling
Anthony Starke	... 	Bedrijfsleider vliegveld
Anton Starke	... 	Opa
Berend Gouke Wendel	... 	Kruidenier
Finbarr Wilbrink	... 	Jan

External links 
 

Dutch biographical drama films
1997 films
1990s Dutch-language films